Liquid!, aka Liquid Graphics, is a firm which has had employees work as colorists in the comics industry. It was established by Aron Lusen and Christian Lichtner in 1996.

Awards
1997: Won for "Favorite Colorist" Wizard Fan Awards
1998: Won "Favorite Colorist" Wizard Fan Awards
1999:
 Won "Favorite Colorist" Wizard Fan Awards, for Uncanny X-Men
 Nominated for "Best Coloring" Eisner Award, for Battle Chasers
 Second in "Favorite Colorist" Comics Buyer's Guide Awards
2000:
 Won "Favorite Colorist" Wizard Fan Awards, for X-Men and Fantastic Four
 Nominated for "Favourite Comics Artist (colouring)" Eagle Award
 Second in "Favorite Colorist" Comics Buyer's Guide Awards
2001: Nominated for "Favourite Colourist" Eagle Award

Notes

References

Liquid Graphics at Marvel.com

External links

Comics colorists